Brian Jackson may refer to:

Entertainment
 Brian Jackson (actor) (1931–2022), British actor in 1980s commercials
 Brian Jackson (conductor) (born 1943), Canadian conductor
 Brian Jackson (musician) (born 1952), American jazz musician
 Brian Jackson (game designer) (born 1972), video game designer
 Brian Keith Jackson (born 1968), American novelist
 Brian Jackson, character in the novel Starter for Ten

Sports
 Brian Jackson (cricketer) (born 1933), English cricketer for Derbyshire
 Brian Jackson (footballer, born 1933) (1933–2020), English footballer
 Brian Jackson (footballer, born 1936) (1936–1992), English footballer
 Brian Jackson (basketball) (born 1959), American basketball player
 Brian Jackson (rugby league) (born 1966), Australian rugby league footballer
 Brian Jackson (American football) (born 1987), American football cornerback

Other
Brian Jackson (educator) (1932–1983), British educator
Brian Anthony Jackson (born 1960), federal judge
Brian Ernest Jackson, Natural Law Party of Ontario candidate for the 1999 Ontario provincial election